Aino-Maija Luukkonen (born 14 October 1958 in Pyhämaa, Uusikaupunki) is the mayor of the Finnish city Pori. She stepped out of the mayor's place in July 2022 and is spending a vacation before retirement in March 2023.

She is a member of the Social Democratic Party of Finland (Suomen Sosialidemokraattinen Puolue).

References

1958 births
Living people
People from Uusikaupunki
Social Democratic Party of Finland politicians
Women mayors of places in Finland